Senator O'Connor College School (also called SOCS, Senator O'Connor CS, Senator O'Connor, OCS, or simply Senator or O'Connor), previously known as John J. Lynch High School until 1967 is a Separate high school in the Parkwoods neighbourhood in the North York district of Toronto, Ontario, Canada serving grades 9 to 12 in the communities of Wexford, Maryvale, Don Mills, and Dorset Park.

The school was named after Senator Frank O'Connor, founder of the Laura Secord chocolate company. The school is part of the Toronto Catholic District School Board and was originally founded as John J. Lynch High School in 1963, named after the first archbishop of Toronto from 1870 to 1888, John Joseph Lynch. It had 1,414 students , and was ranked 266 of 738 secondary schools in the 2017-18 Fraser Institute School Report Card.

History

The story

Frank Patrick O'Connor was a Canadian politician, businessman, philanthropist. He was the founder of Laura Secord Chocolates and Fanny Farmer, and the namesake behind O'Connor Drive in Toronto. He is the son of Mary Eleanor McKeown and Patrick O'Connor, O'Connor quit school at the age of 14 and started working at Canadian General Electric in Peterborough. He married Mary Ellen Hayes and moved with her to Toronto in 1912. He opened the Laura Secord Candy Store on Yonge Street in 1913 as he expanded the store across Canada and into the United States where it was known as Fanny Farmer Candy Stores.

As a Roman Catholic, he gave $500,000 in the 1930s to the Archdiocese of Toronto under the trusteeship of Cardinal James Charles McGuigan. O'Connor was appointed to the Senate of Canada in 1935 by Liberal Prime Minister William Lyon Mackenzie King. He represented the senatorial division of Scarborough Junction, Ontario until his death in 1939. O'Connor survived his wife, who died in 1931, and died at this estate at age 54.

The school history

Prior to the founding of Senator O'Connor College School, several high schools were established around that area after the openings of Winston Churchill Collegiate Institute in Scarborough (1954), Don Mills Collegiate Institute (1957) and nearby Victoria Park Collegiate Institute (1960). In the meantime, several catholic separate schools within the Metropolitan Separate School Board (MSSB, renamed later to the Toronto Catholic District School Board) were opened such as Precious Blood Separate School in 1953 and Annunciation Separate School in 1965.

Senator O'Connor College School was founded by the Brothers of the Christian Schools and the Daughters of Wisdom in 1963 as John J. Lynch High School, becoming the first co-educational Catholic school in the Toronto archdiocese. However, boys were taught by Christian Brothers and girls were taught on a different floor by nuns with the Daughters of Wisdom. In 1965, the second school building designed in an hexagon by Fisher Tedman Architects was erected, given the name Senator O’Connor College School with Brother Denis F.S.C. as its inaugurating principal. Starting in the 1967–68 school year, the "Senator O'Connor" name became the name for the whole school combining the Lynch and O'Connor buildings while the ninth and tenth grades were placed by the MSSB while grades 11–13 continued to be taught by their religious orders. The high school was built on land given to them by Senator Frank Patrick O'Connor, a Catholic philanthropist and founder of Laura Secord Chocolates, a Canadian chocolatier and ice cream company.

Senator O'Connor's House and Garage, and another building, belonging to the Christian Brothers, still exist on campus, and the Christian Brothers still lived there as a Provincial Office up until 2002.

In the 1970s, the Christian Brothers were an active part of school life, teaching classes, holding positions in the school administration and assisting with cafeteria monitoring. The administration of the school was turned over to lay teachers in 1973.

The school used to be split up into three main structures: the main O'Connor building, the JJ Lynch building, and a later addition of a complex of portables under one roof called the "Taj" or the "Taj Mahal".  There was also another area with over a half dozen portables. There used to be an indoor swimming pool connected to the house, but it was torn down sometime in the late 1980s or early 90s. The Christian Brothers' house was located in the center of the campus, and so students would pass right in front of it or around it on all sides daily.

The Christian Brothers' house has been marked as a historic site by the City of Toronto and is protected as such.

In 1984, when the Province of Ontario decided that Catholic secondary schools were to be fully funded, the school became publicly funded by 1987, and Senator O'Connor ceased being a private school. The school is fully operated by the MSSB. The last of the Christian Brothers staff to teach at O'Connor retired at the end of June 1990.

Originally the main high school was built to hold 732 students and by the 1990s the student population almost doubled that figure. Additions to the school such as the "Taj" were made over the course of the school's history. By 1995, talks of building a new school on the property began. That project was protested by local residents until its approval sometime in the early 2000s. In 2002, the Toronto Catholic District School Board acquired the O'Connor House from the Christian Brothers. The old Lynch, O'Connor and Taj Mahal buildings were demolished and a large new modern two-storey 1020-pupil high school which opened in September 2005 is now in place.

The former address of the school was 5 Avonwick Gate. The current address of the new Senator O'Connor College School is 60 Rowena Drive. The address change occurred because the entrance to the school was moved to the opposite end of the property that opens onto Rowena Drive. The new building, designed by Kearns Mancini Architects Inc., was partially built where the Lynch building previously stood as well as on the old athletic field.

Senator O'Connor celebrated its 50th anniversary on June 1, 2013, with a mass and the opening ceremonies, including a presentation to Brother Domenic Viggiani, president of De La Salle College, who accepted plaques on behalf of the school's founding Christian Brothers, some of whom also attended the event. The guests looked at the restoration of the historic O’Connor House, which was damaged in a fire a year prior.

Timeline
1963 - John J. Lynch High School opened its doors on 5 Avonwick Gate by the Brothers of the Christian Schools and the Daughters of Wisdom
1965 - The school was renamed from John J. Lynch to Senator O'Connor.
1966 - The boys and girls of O'Connor were taught in the same classrooms.
1967 - Grades 9 and 10 placed by the Metropolitan Separate School Board.
1973 - Lay teachers take over the school's operations.
1984 - Full funding for Catholic high schools announced by the Ontario Government for grades 11–13.
1987 - Senator O'Connor became a fully publicly funded high school. 
1990 - One of the last of religious staff retired from O'Connor. 
2000 - The Christian Brothers depart the O'Connor House.
2002 - The Senator O'Connor alumni association opens 
2005 - New school facility for O'Connor opened at 60 Rowena Drive.
2007 - The Specialist High Skills Major program, Business begins.
2013 - Senator O'Connor celebrated its 50th anniversary.

Overview

Advanced Placement
The Advanced Placement program continues a tradition of achievement, by providing students with the opportunity for academic enrichment. At Senator O’Connor, a select cohort of students studies at the AP (Enriched) level in Core Courses from the 9th through 12th grades. Students enter this program through an application process undertaken in Grade 8. Students in AP courses study topics in greater depth, enhancing their intellectual development. A flexible program, it can be tailored to meet the specific needs of each individual; students have the opportunity to participate in specific AP subjects in their fields of interest. Students are exposed to university level content and expectations, allowing them to feel more comfortable and have more confidence once they reach the academic setting of university. Writing AP College Board exams at the end of Grade 12 can lead to the acquisition of equivalent credits in participating universities in Canada,  the United States and overseas.

Extended/Immersion French

The Extended/Immersion French program is a continuation of the elementary early or middle French Immersion program. Students who have successfully completed a minimum of ten French courses, four in Extended/Immersion French and six in other subjects taught in French (géographie, histoire and religion) will receive an Extended/Immersion French Certificate upon graduation.

O'Connor students are encouraged to take advantage of outside activities, competitions and foreign exchanges.   A trip to Quebec provides opportunity to practice their French Language skills.

Arts
Though not officially deemed as an Arts high school, O’Connor offers electives in the arts including Drama, Theatre Production, Visual Arts, Applied Design, Vocal and Instrumental Music, Guitar, Piano, Film, Photography, and Yearbook. The Arts department offers extra-curricular opportunities for students through various stage shows, art shows, plays, and music shows, and arts-based clubs. Some clubs include Anime Club, Mural Club, Synergy Dance Crew (competitive), Synergy Dance Club, Yearbook Club, Art Council, Music Council, Drama Council, Jazz Band, Concert Band, Choir, and Stage Crew. O’Connor is equipped with an auditorium that has approximately 230 seats, with up-to-date sound and lighting capabilities.

Administration

Principals

Vice Principals
Laura Dimanno - served at Don Bosco; now at St. Basil-the-Great (2011–present)
Rosemary Balmbra - Currently at the elementary panel as VP of St. Rose of Lima Catholic School (2010-2013) and St. Boniface Catholic School (2013–present)
Louise Brighton (2013–2016) - formerly at St. John Paul II, Loretto Abbey, St. Mother Teresa (VP & teacher), and Don Bosco
Jolanta Hickey (2012-2013) - served as VP at Michael Power/St. Joseph (2011); now Principal at Notre Dame (2013–present); served as the founding Arts/Music teacher and VP at Cardinal Carter (1990-2011; 2012)
Brian Hunt (1994-2005) - Physical Education teacher and VP; served as VP at St. John Henry Newman (2005-2010) and Neil McNeil (2010-2011); now Principal at Francis Libermann (2011–present)
Joseph Liscio (2012–2016) - formerly at Don Bosco and Brebeuf (2008-2012)
Peter O'Neil - served at Madonna and James Cardinal McGuigan; now at Michael Power/St. Joseph (2012–present)
Bernice Peacock (2010-2012) - served at St. Mother Teresa; now at Notre Dame (2012–present)
Franco Rubino - now at Cardinal Carter and Loretto Abbey (2012–present)
Anyta Kyriakou (2016–2019) - formerly at Neil McNeil; now a principal at this school (2019–present)
Katherine Akelaitis (2016–2019) - formerly at Father John Redmond; now at Bishop Allen (2019–present)
Cheryl-Ann Madeira (2019-2021) - formerly at Chaminade; now a principal at Notre Dame (2021–present)
Lisa Bailey (2019-2022) - formerly at Mary Ward
Kathleen Wong (2021-present)
Stella Yusuf (2022-present) - formerly at Notre Dame

Feeder schools
School of the Annunciation
Buchanan Public School
Clairea Public School
Don Mills Middle School
Donview Middle Health & Wellness Academy
Dorset Park Public School
General Brock Public School
General Crerar Public School
George Peck Public School
Holy Spirit Catholic School
Ionview Public School
J.B. Tyrell Senior Public School
John Buchan Senior Public School
Maryvale Public School
Milne Valley Middle School
Our Lady of Fatima Catholic School
Our Lady of Wisdom Catholic School
Precious Blood Catholic School
St. Catherine Catholic School
St. Issac Jogues Catholic School
St. Kevin Catholic School
St. Lawrence Catholic School
St. Maria Goretti Catholic School
Terraview-Willowfield Public School
Wexford Public School

Notable alumni
 Isabel Bayrakdarian - soprano, Juno Award winner
 Ben Johnson - sprinter
 John Kawaja - World Champion curler
 Steve Konroyd - former NHL hockey player
 Elvira Kurt - stand-up comedian
 Maestro Fresh Wes - rapper/producer
 Todd McCarthy - politician, Member of Provincial Parliament for Durham
 Jennifer McKelvie (nee Gray) - Deputy Mayor of Toronto & City Councillor
 Mark McKoy - Olympian (1992 Summer Olympics)
 Tim Micallef - sports broadcaster and radio host
 Tre Mission - rapper/producer
 Bill Morneau - Canada's Minister of Finance November 4, 2015 – August 17, 2020
 Larry Murphy - former professional ice hockey player
 Nasri - songwriter/producer, lead singer of MAGIC!
 Cindy Nicholas - marathon swimmer (Lake Ontario), former politician
 Natalia Popova - Ukrainian figure skater
 Harland Williams - stand-up comedian
 Kevin McKeown and Eric Owen - musicians of the band Black Pistol Fire

See also
List of high schools in Ontario

References

External links
 Senator O'Connor College School

Toronto Catholic District School Board
High schools in Toronto
North York
Catholic secondary schools in Ontario
Educational institutions established in 1963
1963 establishments in Ontario
Toronto